The Rolls-Royce Meteorite was a British V8 petrol or diesel engine of  capacity, and was derived from the Rolls-Royce Meteor, which was itself based on the Rolls-Royce Merlin aircraft engine. The Meteorite was, in essence, two-thirds of a V12 Meteor and it shared the Meteor's 60° vee angle. Meteorites were built for vehicles, for marine use and as stationary power units.

It powered the Thornycroft Antar or Mighty Antar tank transporter and was used to transport two types of Meteor-engined tanks, the Centurion and Conqueror (and also carried the later Chieftain). It was also used in two prototype vehicles, the Leyland Motors FV4202, and the TV1000 experimental six-wheeled vehicle. This association with the defence ministry lasted 21 years to 1964 and was centred at the Acocks Green "shadow factory" near Birmingham

See also
 Rolls-Royce Merlin
 Rolls-Royce Meteor

References

External links
 http://www.rrec.org.uk/History/Clan_Foundry_Belper.php

Aero-derivative engines
Marine engines
Meteorite
Meteorite
Meteorite
Gasoline engines by model
Diesel engines by model
V8 engines